Diana Melinda Lebacs (12 September 1947 – 11 July 2022) was a Curaçaoan educator, actress, and author, most known for her children's literature. She wrote in both Papiamento and Dutch. In 2003 she earned the inaugural Prins Bernhard Cultuurfonds Caribisch Gebied (PBCCG Cultuurprijs, Prince Bernhard Caribbean Cultural Fund Prize) for her book Caimin's geheim and in 2007 she was honored as a Knight in the Order of Orange-Nassau.

Early life
Diana Melinda Lebacs was born on 12 September 1947 in the Chere Asile neighborhood of Willemstad, capital of the Territory of Curaçao. Her mother, Esther Amalia Doelwijt, was Creole from Suriname and spoke Sranan Tongo, having moved to Curaçao at the age of eighteen. Her father, Willem Mertjo Lebacs, was a chief customs officer who also worked as a carpenter and artistic woodcarver. Willem's father was from Bandabou on Curaçao; he had completed his military service in Indonesia and married a Malay woman there before returning to Curaçao. Her grandmother never learned Dutch and only spoke the Malay language and Papiamento. As her parents could only communicate in Dutch, Lebacs grew up speaking Dutch and Papiamento at home.

After Lebacs completed her primary education at the Philomena School, she attended the María Immaculata Lyceum for her secondary studies. During this time (1960–1961), she began writing novels for teenage girls. She also sang in a band called Teenage Shadows from 1963 to 1966. In 1966, she graduated from the Willemstad Pedagogical Academy. The play performed at the commencement ceremony, Regels voor ezels (Rules for Donkeys), was written by Lebacs. The following year, she married Pacheco Domacassé, who had directed Teenage Shadows and was also a guitarist and singer. He would later head the cultural section of the Education and Cultural Department of Bonaire.

Career
In May 1968, Lebacs' mother died. In August, she and her husband embarked on a six-month tour of western Europe. During their travels, she began to write a novel, Sherry—het begin van een begin (Sherry—The Beginning of the Beginning), a coming of age story of an Antillean girl. The novel delved into the socio-economic development of the islands and the labor strikes which occurred in conjunction with anticolonial uprisings in Curaçao in 1969. That summer, she sent the book to Leopold Publishing in The Hague and waited six months for their response. After agreeing to publish the novel and completing the edits they wanted, Lebacs enrolled in a two-year Papiamento literary course in 1970 to gain a better insight into the lingua franca of her homeland. She wanted to publish children's stories in the language spoken by children in the Dutch Antilles.

In 1971, Sherry premiered and two years later was translated into Finnish by the publisher Tammi. In 1973, Lebacs wrote a youth theater play, which was the first dramatization written in Papiamento in over twenty-five years. Buchi Wan pia fini (Buchi Wan Skinny Legs), premiered with her husband as director, was a critique of European education systems and featured live exchanges between the actors and the audience. After its debut, the play was presented several times in Aruba, Bonaire and Curaçao and published in 1974.

Lebacs continued working on several fronts simultaneously throughout the 1980s and 1990s. She published children's fiction in Dutch and Papiamento, educational textbooks for elementary students, developed television programs about the Spanish and Dutch colonization history of Curacao, and acted in two films, Famia kibrá and Boka Sarantonio (Sarantonio Bay). She also participated in community projects including book fairs, workshops to end violence against women, and programs to protect the environment. In 1994, Lebacs published her first novel for adults, De langste maand (The Longest Month), which evaluates disparities in traditional local values and Westernized expectations.

In 2003 Lebacs earned the inaugural Prins Bernhard Cultuurfonds Caribisch Gebied (PBCCG Cultuurprijs, Prince Bernhard Caribbean Cultural Fund Prize) for her book Caimin's geheim (Caimin's Secret) and in 2007 was honored as a Knight in the Order of Orange-Nassau. That same year, she completed her bachelor's degree in Papiamento at the University of the Netherlands Antilles and went on to earn her master's degree in 2011. Subsequently, she began teaching courses in Papiamento at the university for beginning students.  She was a winner of the 2012  prize.  In 2014, Lebacs debuted her first collection of poetry, Belumbe/De Waterlijn (The Waterline).

Personal life
Lebacs and her husband Pacheco had two children. Lebacs died from pancreatic cancer at a hospice in Willemstad on 11 July 2022 at the age of 74.  Pacheco had died in March 2022 at the age of 80.

Partial bibliography

References

Citations

General and cited reference

External links 
 

1947 births
2022 deaths
People from Willemstad
Curaçao women
Curaçao people of African descent
Curaçao people of Surinamese descent
Curaçao people of Malay descent
20th-century Dutch women writers
21st-century Dutch women writers
Dutch women's rights activists
South American environmentalists
Knights of the Order of Orange-Nassau
Academic staff of the University of Curaçao
Deaths from pancreatic cancer
Papiamento-language writers